Charlotte Rothstein Ross, née Bergman (1912 – 1991) was an American artist. Her work is included in the collections of the Smithsonian American Art Museum, the Museum of Modern Art, New York, 
the Crystal Bridges Museum of American Art 
and the Art Institute of Chicago. She was the wife of novelist and scriptwriter Sam Ross.

References

1912 births
1991 deaths
Artists from Chicago
20th-century American women artists
American women painters
Artists in the Smithsonian American Art Museum collection